There are over 20,000 Grade II* listed buildings in England. This page is a list of these buildings in the district of Warwick in Warwickshire.

Warwick

|}

See also
 Grade I listed buildings in Warwickshire

Notes

External links

Lists of listed buildings in Warwickshire
 
Warwick District